Lord Brackley's XI was the fifth team of English cricketers to tour the West Indies, playing in the 1904–05 season. The team was captained by John Egerton, 4th Earl of Ellesmere (Lord Brackley) and played a total of 20 matches between January and April 1905, of which ten are regarded as first-class.

The team
For the first time on a tour of the West Indies, professionals were taken: Ernie Hayes of Surrey and George Thompson of Northamptonshire.

Thirteen players toured:

Lord Brackley, Captain
Clive Burn
Terence Cole
George Drummond
Charles Ebden
Cyril Foley
Hesketh Hesketh-Prichard
Horatio Powys-Keck
George Simpson-Hayward
Arthur Somerset senior
Teddy Wynyard
Ernie Hayes
George Thompson

John Moss was taken as umpire and also played in some minor matches. None of the players had been in the earlier touring sides to the West Indies. The inclusion of the two professionals considerably strengthened the team. Thompson had played for Northamptonshire in 1904, their last season as a minor county. He was, however, well up to first class standard. The amateurs were of mixed standard, including a number of useful players like Simpson-Hayward, Somerset and Wynyard together with a number of borderline first class standard including the captain himself. G. Bellamy accompanied the team as scorer and played in a first class match against Jamaica. S. Beton played in a minor match.

The tour

 12, 13 January : v Jamaica
 14, 16 January : v XVIII of Jamaica, odds match 12 v 18
 17 January : v Jamaica Garrison, 12-a-side
 19, 20, 21 January: v Jamaica
 31 January, 1–2 February : v Barbados
 3, 4 February : v XVIII of Barbados, odds match 12 v 18
 6, 7, 8 February: v West Indies at Kensington Oval, Bridgetown, Barbados. Lord Brackley's XI 353 defeated West Indies 107 and 229 by an innings and 17 runs. Wynyard scored 101; Thompson took 6 for 38 and 5 for 63.
 8, 9, 10 February: v Barbados
 15, 16 February : v St. Lucia
 17, 18 February : v Garrison XI (in St. Lucia)
 20, 21 February : v St. Lucia
 27 February : v Barbados Garrison
 2, 3, 4 March v : British Guiana
 6, 7, 8 March v : British Guiana
 14, 15, 16 March : v St. Vincent
 17, 18 March : v St. Vincent
 21, 22, 23 March : v Queens' Park (in Trinidad)
 25, 27, 28 March v : Trinidad
 31 March, 1, 3, 4 April v : West Indies at Queen's Park Oval, Port of Spain, Trinidad. Lord Brackley's XI 181 and 147 defeated West Indies 170 and 154 by 4 runs. Lebrun Constantine was the highest scorer, with 35 and 56; Thompson took 5 for 67 and 2 for 62.
 4, 5, 6 April v : Trinidad

First-class matches are highlighted.

Of the 10 first-class matches, 6 were won, 3 lost and 1 drawn. Overall 11 matches were won, 3 lost and 6 drawn. The first matches of the tour were in Jamaica rather than Barbados as had happened on previous tours. The tourists were lucky to draw the first match against Jamaica but the next week won heavily by an innings and 169 runs. The tourists lost the second match against Barbados and then twice to Trinidad. Both match against the combined XI were won. A number of the minor matches were drawn but the tourists did win by an innings in all their matches in St. Lucia with the home team never scoring more than 102 in any innings. St. Vincent took the first innings lead in both their games but both matches were drawn.

Although in their mid to late 40s Wynyard and Somerset were highly successful batsmen supported well by Hayes. Other batsmen performed well in the minor matches but were less successful in the important games. Thompson was the mainstay of the bowling taking 75 first class wickets and 126 in all matches. Hayes and Simpson-Hayward also made useful contributions with the ball.

Averages

The following averages are in the 10 first-class matches

Batting

Bowling

Return match
When the West Indians toured England in 1906 they played a match against Lord Brackley's XI at Lord's. Lord Brackley's XI, all of whom had toured in 1904–05, won the three-day match by two wickets.

References

Annual reviews
 Wisden Cricketers' Almanack 1906, pages 514 to 534

Further reading
 Peter Wynne-Thomas, The Complete History of Cricket Tours at Home & Abroad, Guild, 1989

External links
 Lord Brackley's XI in West Indies 1904–05 at CricketArchive

1905 in English cricket
1905 in West Indian cricket
1904–05
International cricket competitions from 1888–89 to 1918
West Indian cricket seasons from 1890–91 to 1917–18